Verkhniye Lubyanki is a rural locality (a selo) in Volokonovsky District, Belgorod Oblast, Russia. The population was 264 as of 2010. There are 6 streets.

Geography 
Verkhniye Lubyanki is located 12 km southwest of Volokonovka (the district's administrative centre) by road. Yevdokimov is the nearest rural locality.

References 

Rural localities in Volokonovsky District